BWI may refer to:
 Baltimore/Washington International Airport's IATA code
 BWI Rail Station, a rail station near the airport
 ISO 639-3 code for Baniwa language of Içana
 BirdWatch Ireland, a conservation organisation
 British West Indies
 British West Indies Federation's former IOC country code
 British West Indies dollar (BWI$), a defunct currency
 Building and Wood Workers' International, a global union federation
 BWI Center for Industrial Management, a research institute at ETH Zürich
 Booker Washington Institute, a high school in Kakata, Liberia
 BWI GmbH, IT services provider to the German military etc.
 BeijingWest Industries, supplier of brake and suspension systems